Samuel Dickson (1776 – 28 October 1850) was an Irish Peelite politician.

He was a member of the Union Club.

References

External links
 

UK MPs 1847–1852
Members of the Parliament of the United Kingdom for County Limerick constituencies (1801–1922)
1776 births
1850 deaths